Billy Adam Calvert is an American politician and businessman serving as a member of the Mississippi House of Representatives from the 83rd district. Elected in November 2019, he assumed office on January 7, 2020.

Early life and education 
Calvert was born and raised in Meridian, Mississippi. He earned an associate degree from East Mississippi Community College and a Bachelor of Science degree in applied sciences from the University of Mississippi.

Career 
Calvert owns Southern Business Supply, an office supplies store. He was elected to the Mississippi House of Representatives in November 2019 and assumed office on January 7, 2020. Calvert succeeded Greg Snowden.

References 

Living people
Republican Party members of the Mississippi House of Representatives
People from Meridian, Mississippi
East Mississippi Community College alumni
University of Mississippi alumni
Year of birth missing (living people)